Anguk station, also known as Hyundai E&C station, is a subway station on the Line 3 of the Seoul Metropolitan Subway. The station is located in the Anguk neighborhood of Jongno District, Seoul and is the nearest subway station to the Insa and Samcheong neighborhoods. The station is also near the ancient royal residence of Unhyeongung.

Station layout

Vicinity
Exit 1 : Deokseong Girls' Middle & High Schools. Jeongdok Public Library
Exit 2 : Jaedong Elementary School
Exit 3 : Changdeokgung, Hyundai Mobis Headquarters
Exit 4 : Unhyeongung, Nakwon Sangka
Exit 5 : Seoul Elderly Welfare Center
Exit 6 : Jongno Police Station, Insadong

Tourism
In January 2013, the Seoul Metropolitan Rapid Transit Corporation, which operates this line, published free guidebooks in three languages: English, Japanese and Chinese (simplified and traditional), which features eight tours as well as recommendations for accommodations, restaurants and shopping centers. The tours are designed with different themes, e.g. Korean traditional culture, which goes from Jongno 3-ga Station to this station and Gyeongbokgung Station on line No 3 that showcases antique shops and art galleries of Insa-dong.

In March 2018

Anguk Station of Seoul Subway Line 3 will be transformed into a history of independence movement themes for the first time in Korea.

Seoul City is the only one among 950 subway and urban railway stations nationwide to mark the 99 years of the March 1 Independence Movement theme history

The four-story platform section of Anguk Station will contain the achievements and quotations of 80 independence activists including Kim Gu, Ahn Jung-geun, Yoon Bong-gil, Yoo Gwan-sun and Lee Bong-chang. The second and third basement floors of this year will also be built with independence movement and temporary government as the theme of the exhibition and rest area.

References

Metro stations in Jongno District
Seoul Metropolitan Subway stations
Railway stations in South Korea opened in 1985
Seoul Subway Line 3